Friedrich Wilhelm I (25 April 1562 in Weimar – 7 July 1602 in Weimar) was a duke of Saxe-Weimar.  He was the eldest son of Johann Wilhelm, Duke of Saxe-Weimar and Dorothea Susanne of Simmern.

Life
At the time of the death of his father (1573), Friedrich Wilhelm was still under age; for this, a tutelary government for the duchy was appointed. The Dowager Duchess, Dorothea Susanne, could however not prevent the Elector Augustus of Saxony - from the Albertine line - from being designated as the regent in her place.

In 1586, Friedrich Wilhelm was declared an adult and began his independent government over in Saxe-Weimar. Five years later, in 1591, the Elector Christian I of Saxony died and was succeeded by his eldest son Christian II. Because the new Elector was still under age, the regency of the Electorate was assigned to Sophie of Brandenburg, widow of Christian I and mother of the heir. While she became regent, Friedrich Wilhelm was asked to assist and given the title of Administrator des Sächsischen Kurstaates (Administrator of the Saxon Electorate). He took residence in Torgau, and neglected the government of his duchy (which was instead led by his younger brother John, who had to take part – in accordance with the Ernestine House Law – anyway in the government).

In 1601, Sophie's regency in the Electorate of Saxony ended with the majority of Elector Christian II, and Friedrich Wilhelm returned to Weimar. Since he died one year later, he did not leave large traces in the history of the duchy.

Marriage and children
In Weimar on 5 May 1583 Friedrich Wilhelm married firstly with Sophie, daughter of Christoph, Duke of Württemberg. They had six children:
Dorothea Marie (b. Weimar, 8 May 1584 – d. Weimar, 9 September 1586)
Johann Wilhelm, Hereditary Prince of Saxe-Weimar (b. Weimar, 30 June 1585 – d. Weimar, 23 January 1587)
Friedrich (b. Weimar, 26 September 1586 – d. Weimar, 19 January 1587)
Dorothea Sophia (b. Weimar, 19 December 1587 – d. Weimar, 10 February 1645), Princess-Abbess of Quedlinburg (1618)
Anna Marie (b. Weimar, 31 March 1589 – d. Dresden, 15 December 1626)
stillborn son (Vacha, 21 July 1590).

In Neuburg an der Donau on 9 September 1591 Friedrich Wilhelm married secondly with Anna Maria, daughter of Philipp Ludwig, Count Palatine of Neuburg. They had six children:
Johann Philipp, Duke of Saxe-Altenburg (b. Torgau, 25 January 1597 – d. Altenburg, 1 April 1639)
Anna Sophie (b. Torgau, 3 February 1598 – d. Öls, 20 March 1641), married on 4 December 1618 to Duke Karl Friedrich of Münsterberg-Öls.
Friedrich, Duke of Saxe-Altenburg (b. Torgau, 12 February 1599 – killed in battle, 24 October 1625)
Johann Wilhelm, Duke of Saxe-Altenburg (1600–1632) (b. Torgau, 13 April 1600 – d. army camp outside Brieg, 2 December 1632)
Dorothea (b. Torgau, 26 June 1601 – d. Altenburg, 10 April 1675), married on 24 June 1633 to Albrecht, Duke of Saxe-Eisenach.
Friedrich Wilhelm II, Duke of Saxe-Altenburg (b. posthumously, Weimar, 12 February 1603 – d. Altenburg, 22 April 1669)

References

NB: This entry quotes German Wikipedia: :de:Friedrich Wilhelm I. (Sachsen-Weimar) as a source.

Ancestry

|-

1562 births
1602 deaths
Nobility from Weimar
House of Wettin
Dukes of Saxe-Weimar